Savieri Ngidhi (born March 2, 1968) is a retired Zimbabwean middle-distance runner.

Achievements 
1999 African Southern Region Championships - gold medal (1500 m)
1999 IAAF World Indoor Championships - sixth place (800 m)
1995 All-Africa Games - bronze medal (800 m)
1995 Penn Relays 4 × 800 m Champion-Peter Engelbrecht (RSA)-1:49.70,Ozzie Mdziniso (SWZ)-1:49.70, Thomas Korir (KEN)-1:49.50, Savieri Nghidi (ZIM)-1:45.90
1995 Penn Relays Sprint Medley Relay Champion - Joseph Styles, Kevin Dilworth, Robert Guy, Savieri Ngidhi
1995 NCAA Division II Champion Outdoor 800 m and 1500 m
1995 NCAA Division II Indoor Champion 800 m and 1500 m
1994 NCAA Division II Champion Outdoor 800 m and 1500 m
1994 NCAA Division II Indoor Champion 800 m and 1500 m
1994 Commonwealth Games - bronze medal (800 m)
1990 African Zone VI Championships - gold medal (800 m)
1990 African Zone VI Championships - gold medal (1500 m)

External links
 

1968 births
Living people
Zimbabwean male middle-distance runners
Athletes (track and field) at the 1994 Commonwealth Games
Athletes (track and field) at the 1998 Commonwealth Games
Athletes (track and field) at the 1996 Summer Olympics
Olympic athletes of Zimbabwe
Commonwealth Games bronze medallists for Zimbabwe
Commonwealth Games medallists in athletics
World Athletics Championships athletes for Zimbabwe
Abilene Christian Wildcats men's track and field athletes
Junior college men's track and field athletes in the United States
African Games bronze medalists for Zimbabwe
African Games medalists in athletics (track and field)
Athletes (track and field) at the 1995 All-Africa Games
Medallists at the 1994 Commonwealth Games